The Houtermans Award is given annually by the European Association of Geochemistry for outstanding contributions to geochemistry made by scientists under 35 years old or within 6 years of their PhD award.  The award is named after Fritz Houtermans and consists of an engraved medal and an honorarium of 1000 Euros. The Houtermans Award has in the past been disproportionately given to white men, though this is changing.

Award Winners
Source: ERG

See also

 List of geology awards

References

European science and technology awards
Geochemistry
Geology awards